Lendwithcare is a microfinance lending website from the development charity CARE International UK. Launched in September 2010, it allows individuals and groups to make small loans to entrepreneurs in developing countries, and help them work their way out of poverty. It supports entrepreneurs in Cambodia, Togo, Benin, the Philippines, Bosnia and Herzegovina, Vietnam and Ecuador through partner microfinance institutions (MFIs). It does not charge any interest on the loans made to entrepreneurs by supporters - the MFIs do.

By 2015, over 21,000 lenders loaned almost £6m to around 17,000 entrepreneurs.

The process
Lendwithcare works with a number of partner microfinance institutions (MFIs) in the countries in which it operates. If the MFI is happy with an entrepreneur's idea or business plan, they approve the proposal and provide the initial loan requested. They also help the entrepreneur construct their profile for lendwithcare.org.

Lenders can browse the list of entrepreneurs on the website, read about their businesses, see the value of the loan they have requested, the percentage of the loan already provided by other lenders, and then choose an entrepreneur to lend to.  Once the entrepreneur's loan is fully funded, the money is transferred to the MFI to replace the initial loan already paid out to the entrepreneur. During this process lenders receive progress updates regarding the entrepreneur's progress. The entrepreneur gradually pays back their loan according to a repayment schedule. The MFI transfers these repayments to CARE International who then credits the payment into lenders' lendwithcare.org accounts. Lenders can then either withdraw their money using a PayPal account or can use the credit to provide a loan to another entrepreneur.

History
 2010 - Lendwithcare.org launched in September.
 2012 - launch of group lending feature to allow members of churches, sports teams, co-operatives etc. to lend as a group of individuals.

Partner MFIs
 Benin - Association des Caisses de Financement à la Base (ACFB), established in 2004. Based in the capital Cotonou with branches across the country.
 Bosnia and Herzegovina - Zene za Zene, established in 1997 by Women for Women International. Based in Sarajevo with branches around the country.
 Cambodia - Cambodian Community Savings Federation (CCSF), established in 2003. Based in Battambang and Banteay Meanchey provinces.
 Ecuador - Fundación de Apoyo Comunitario y Social del Ecuador (FACES), established in 1991 and based in Loja.
 Philippines - SEEDFINANCE, established in 2007. Based in Mandaluyong in Metro Manila with field operations in Luzon, Cebu, Leyte, Southern Leyte, Panay, Negros, Samar, and Mindanao.
 Togo - Women and Associations for Gain both Economic and Social (WAGES), established in 1994. Based in Lomé with 10 branches across the country.
 Vietnam - Microfinance and Community Development Institute (MACDI), established in 2007. Based in Hanoi with most activities in northern and central Vietnam.

Ambassadors
 Stacey Dooley travelled to Bosnia and Herzegovina in 2012.
 Deborah Meaden travelled to Cambodia in 2011.
 Alastair Stewart travelled to Bosnia and Herzegovina in 2011 to visit CARE's partner Zene za Zene. He met many entrepreneurs, including women widowed by Srebrenica massacre.

References

External links
 

Online financial services companies of the United Kingdom
Economics websites
Internet properties established in 2010
Microfinance organizations
Organisations based in the London Borough of Lambeth